This is a list of events and standings for the Professional Fighters League, a mixed martial arts organization based in the United States, for the 2019 season.

Each weight class had 12 fighters, except the women's class which had 8 fighters. Each fighter faced two rivals in the regular season. The top fighters in each weight class (8 in the men's classes, 4 in the women's class) qualified to the playoffs. The season concluded on December 31, 2019 with six championship bouts back-to-back with a $10 million prize pool.

2019 world champions

Events

2019 PFL Heavyweight playoffs

* Francimar Barroso was forced to withdraw from the competition due to being ruled “not healthy enough to continue.” Alex Nicholson was selected to take his spot in the heavyweight semifinals, but was also later ruled unfit to compete. Kelvin Tiller was eventually chosen to return to the competition to face Jared Rosholt.

2019 PFL Light Heavyweight playoffs

2019 PFL Welterweight playoffs

* Magomed Magomedkerimov was originally scheduled to face Ray Cooper III but was unable to continue in the tournament. He was replaced by his quarterfinal opponent, Chris Curtis.

2019 PFL Lightweight playoffs

2019 PFL Women's Lightweight playoffs

* Genah Fabian was originally scheduled to face Kayla Harrison but was forced to pull out of the bout. She was replaced by Bobbi Jo Dalziel.

2019 PFL Featherweight playoffs

*Daniel Pineda was originally scheduled to face Lance Palmer but was forced to pull out of the bout after failing NAC drug test. He was replaced by Alex Gilpin.

Standings
The PFL points system is based on results of the match. The winner of a fight receives 3 points. If the fight ends in a draw, both fighters will receive 1 point. The bonus for winning a fight in the first, second, or third round is 3 points, 2 points, and 1 point respectively. The bonus for winning in the third round requires a fight be stopped before 4:59 of the third round. No bonus point will be awarded if a fighter wins via decision. For example, if a fighter wins a fight in the first round, then the fighter will receive 6 total points. A decision win will result in three total points. If a fighter misses weight, the opponent (should they comply with weight limits) will receive 3 points due to a walkover victory, regardless of winning or losing the bout; if the non-offending fighter subsequently wins with a stoppage, all bonus points will be awarded.

Heavyweight

Light Heavyweight

Welterweight

Lightweight

Women's Lightweight

Featherweight

♛ = Clinched playoff spot ---
E = Eliminated

See also
List of PFL events
List of current PFL fighters

References

2019
2019 in mixed martial arts
Mixed martial arts in New York (state)
Sports in Manhattan
2019 in sports in New York (state)
December 2019 sports events in the United States